The 1969 All-Ireland Senior Football Championship was the 83rd staging of the All-Ireland Senior Football Championship, the Gaelic Athletic Association's premier inter-county Gaelic football tournament. The championship began on 4 May 1969 and ended on 28 September 1969.

Down entered the championship as the defending champions, however, they were defeated by Cavan in the Ulster final.

On 28 September 1969, Kerry won the championship following a 0-10 to 0-7 defeat of Offaly in the All-Ireland final. This was their 21st All-Ireland title, their first in seven championship seasons.

Kerry's Mick O'Dwyer was the choice for Texaco Footballer of the Year.

Results

Connacht Senior Football Championship

Quarter-final

Semi-finals

 

Finals

Leinster Senior Football Championship

First round

Second round

 
  

Quarter-finals

  
  
     

Semi-finals

 

Final

Munster Senior Football Championship

Quarter-finals

   
 

Semi-finals

 

Final

Ulster Senior Football Championship

Preliminary round

Quarter-finals

 
 
 

Semi-finals

 
 

Final

All-Ireland Senior Football Championship

Semi-finals

 
 

Final

Championship statistics

Miscellaneous

 St. Coman's Park, Roscommon changed its name to Dr. Hyde Park after Ireland's 1st President, Douglas Hyde.
 The throw-in for the Munster quarter-final between Clare and Limerick was delayed by 25 minutes.
 At the Ulster semi-final between Cavan and Derry an 80-year-old retired farmer collapses and dies.
 The All-Ireland semi-final between Cavan and Offaly ends level and goes to a replay. It is the first time since 1960 that a semi-final ended in a draw which was the Down vs Offaly game.

Scorers

Overall

Single game

References

All-Ireland Senior Football Championship